Carabus serratus is a species of ground beetle in the family Carabidae. It is found in North America.

Subspecies
These two subspecies belong to the species Carabus serratus:
 Carabus serratus serratus
 Carabus serratus vegasensis Casey

References

Further reading

 

serratus
Articles created by Qbugbot
Beetles described in 1823